The Kantō dialects (関東方言 kantō hōgen, 関東弁 kantō-ben) are a group of Japanese dialects spoken in the Kantō region (except for the Izu Islands). The Kantō dialects include the Tokyo dialect which is the basis of modern standard Japanese. Along with the Tōhoku dialect, Kantō dialects have been characterized by the use of a suffix -be or -ppe; Kantō speakers were called Kantō bei by Kansai speakers in the Edo period. Eastern Kantō dialects share more features with the Tōhoku dialect. After the Pacific War, the southern Kantō regions such as Kanagawa, Saitama, and Chiba prefectures developed as satellite cities of Tokyo, and today traditional dialects in these areas have been almost entirely replaced by standard Japanese.

Kantō dialects
 West Kantō
 Tokyo dialect (central Tokyo)
 Yamanote dialect (old upper-class dialect)
 Shitamachi dialect or Edo dialect (old working-class dialect)
 Tama dialect (Western Tokyo)
 Saitama dialect (Saitama Prefecture)
 Chichibu dialect (Chichibu)
 Gunma dialect or Jōshū dialect (Gunma Prefecture)
 Kanagawa dialect (Kanagawa Prefecture)
 Chiba dialect (Chiba Prefecture)
 Bōshū dialect (Southern Chiba Prefecture)
 Gun'nai dialect (Eastern Yamanashi Prefecture)
 East Kantō
 Ibaraki dialect (Ibaraki Prefecture)
 Tochigi dialect (Tochigi Prefecture)

 Northern Izu Archipelago dialects (Northern Izu Islands, Tokyo)

Kantō Japanese in other regions
The Hokkaidō dialect is the closest to Standard Japanese because colonists from various regions settled the area, so that use of the standard language was required in order to facilitate communication. In the Ryukyu Islands, Standard Japanese developed into a dialect known as Okinawan Japanese, which has been influenced by the Ryukyuan languages.

Notes

References

Japanese dialects
Kantō region